Maxwell "Maxxie" Oliver is a fictional character in the British television series Skins. He is portrayed by actor Mitch Hewer.

Characterisation
Maxxie is portrayed as proficient at several styles of dance, including tap dance. He is also shown as being a brilliant artist, seductive, well-liked and well-adjusted. He is hinted to having many promiscuous relationships throughout the series. He is somewhat of a comedian, particularly with best friends Anwar Kharral and Chris Miles. According to a Myspace-style "about me" section on the Skins website, he describes his favorite things as toast, boys, dancing, drawing, Arcade Fire and the Sistine Chapel, and he wants to meet Johnny Depp, Nigel Reo-Coker and Ron from Harry Potter.

Like Anwar, Maxxie does not have an episode name to himself, instead being the centric character in "Maxxie & Anwar" and "Tony & Maxxie". Although the episode "Sketch" greatly involves him, as it is about his stalker.

Character history

Series 1
In "Tony", he convinces Anwar and Chris to join him on a "big gay night out", but eventually goes to Abigail Stock's party after the night out wasn't what was expected.

In "Maxxie and Anwar", on a school trip to Russia, Maxxie and his best mate Anwar face issues regarding their status as best friends, with Anwar's faith condemning homosexuality. Maxxie indicates he views Anwar as homophobic and hypocritical – as a Muslim, Anwar dislikes gay people but at the same time has pre-marital sex, takes drugs and drinks alcohol. Maxxie then swaps rooms with Sid, so he is now sharing a room with Tony Stonem, who tries repeatedly to seduce Maxxie to 'try something new' which Maxxie refuses because of Tony's girlfriend Michelle Richardson. After his fight with Anwar (which was somewhat promoted by Tony), he is confronted by a Russian woman, who eventually invites him to her private headquarters to drink vodka after seeing his Neil Diamond t-shirt. He gets very drunk and after he tries to save Anwar from a standoff, he tries one more time to heal their friendship. In his distraught state he gives into temptation with Tony for means of comfort – and informs Tony that he wasn't good. Unknown to them, Michelle has witnessed the entire thing.

In "Michelle", Tony is seen continuing to flirt with Maxxie, and Michelle subsequently dumps Tony. Maxxie is quick to apologise to Michelle for the incident in Russia, and he is upset when she derides him as a "dirty little slut who fucks around with other people's boyfriends". Later, racked with guilt over his friends' breakup, Maxxie states in his psychology lesson that it was his fault that Tony ended up giving him head, to quote 'I lost my head and then he [Tony] gave me head', despite the fact that everything that happened had been pushed for and orchestrated by Tony.

In the series 1 finale, Maxxie calls Anwar to wish him a happy birthday, however, he refuses to attend his party until Anwar tells his parents that Maxxie is gay. Anwar, desperate to see Maxxie, eventually finds him waiting outside, still refusing to go inside. Mr. Kharral eventually arrives outside, spotting Maxxie and the two talk until Anwar tells his father that Maxxie is gay. Mr. Kharral seemingly ignores Anwar until Maxxie restates it himself. Mr. Kharral then explains that there are a lot of things in the world he doesn't understand – particularly homosexuality – but that his faith in Allah means he believes God one day will reveal to him all he does not understand and until then, will treat Maxxie no differently. With that, Maxxie and Anwar's friendship is renewed. Maxxie and Anwar also back up Chris in the brawl later that night and in the end Maxxie happily ends up in an embrace with one of Chris' attackers who has seemingly fallen for him.

Series 2
The series two premiere episode, which is focused on Tony, introduces Maxxie's parents: Jackie (Fiona Allen) and Walter Oliver (Bill Bailey), revealing Maxxie's surname, that he has a dog called Taz and the situation with his parents. After Tony's accident in series one and his subsequent brain trauma, Maxxie, Jal Fazer and Chris are the only friends who are still there for him. His mother, who used to work as Tony's nanny, is taking on that role again. Like Maxxie, his father and even his dog dance in their spare time, although Maxxie struggles to convince his dad to let him drop his A Levels and audition for musicals in London. Though Maxxie generally comes from a stable home with loving parents, he remains subject to homophobic abuse from "chavs" on the council estate where he lives. It later turns out that one of the chavs – Dale – is in fact gay after tackling Maxxie to the ground and kissing him at a later opportunity. Maxxie resists at first but eventually gives in and they end up sleeping together. When Maxxie returns home the next morning, he sees a distraught Tony and comforts him. Eventually in the episode, after Walter has had much time to reflect on his relationship with his son, they agree that he will at least continue his A Levels, even if he does not join his father as a builder afterwards as Walter would prefer. At a couple of points (including having pictures taken on him), Maxxie becomes suspicious of stalking, setting up the next episode.

In "Sketch", Maxxie is stalked by Sketch, a young Welsh student who cares for her ailing mother in the flat opposite Maxxie's. Sketch takes pictures of Maxxie and pins them up on a board of her room, leaves Maxxie several gifts in his locker, leaving him to wonder who they're from, makes herself appear more masculine (such as wearing male clothing and flattening her chest with a sash) to appear attractive to him, and watches him practice a performance with Michelle in a musical.

Following this, in the Unseen Skins episode "A Cycological Romance", Monday: Maxxie meets a new love interest: James (played by Sean Verey), who is also gay and a cyclist. Maxxie seems very interested, leaving him a note on his bicycle. Sketch steals this note, later slashing Maxxie's tires. Tuesday: Maxxie is forced to take the bus, and so leaving a window for Sketch to approach James warning him off on the grounds that she was his ex-girlfriend and he stalks her (both lies). Wednesday: James tells Maxxie to leave him alone, only to work out Sketch was lying. The next morning (Thursday), James finds his tires slashed and is also forced to get the bus, meeting Maxxie on board. They talk and work out that this is all Sketch's work; they decide to start again. Sketch is seen outside looking in with a face of melancholy, as the two exchange names. In the television episode "Jal", Maxxie proudly introduces James to everyone at college. Sketch seems to look jealous at the pairing whilst Anwar looks uneasy.

In his last episode, Maxxie and James move to London together, also being joined by Anwar, who abandons Sketch at the bus stop.

Post-Series 2
In the fourth Skins Short, which was made alongside series 4, Thomas and JJ are applying for a job at the cinema, where the latter is seen wearing Maxxie's Superman costume, a reference to the fancy-dress party scene in Sketch's episode and is later seen wearing Sketch's costume.

U.S. adaption
Maxxie was the only character from the original UK version who didn't appear in the American adaptation. He was replaced by Tea Marvelli, a self-proclaimed lesbian. The series' decision to Tony's sexual fluidity and attraction to Maxxie with Tea's sexual confusion and attraction to Tony, was criticised for replacing self-confident bisexual and gay characters with a heteronormative story about teenage sexual confusion.

References

External links

Maxxie Oliver on the official E4 Skins site
 Maxxie Oliver on Myspace

Skins (British TV series) characters
Fictional artists
Fictional English people
Television characters introduced in 2007
Fictional dancers
Fictional singers
Fictional gay males
Fictional LGBT characters in television
Male characters in television
Teenage characters in television
British male characters in television